Akrad Ibrahim is a Syrian village located in the Hirbnafsah Subdistrict in Hama District. According to the Syria Central Bureau of Statistics (CBS), Akrad Ibrahim had a population of 698 in the 2004 census. Its inhabitants are predominantly Sunni Muslims.

References 

Populated places in Hama District